The Surgut-2 Power Station on the Ob River in Russia is the second-largest gas-fired power station in the world, and largest in Russia with an installed capacity of  in 2016.  it is the gas-fired power plant (of those Climate Trace was able to monitor) which emits the most greenhouse gas with 31.5 million tonnes.

Expansion in 2011 
They consume natural gas as a fuel, utilizing combined cycle, with overall efficiency rates of 56%. General Electric is the manufacturer and supplier of the generators.

See also 

 List of power stations in Russia
 Surgut-1 Power Station

References 

Oil-fired power stations in Russia